Serafino Biagioni (12 March 1920, at Pistoia, Italy – 13 February 1983) was an Italian professional road bicycle racer.

Professional career
He was professional from 1945 to 1956 and won 8 victories. He won two stage victories in the 1951 Tour de France and wore the yellow jersey. Other victories include three stage wins in the Giro d'Italia.

Major results

1939
Giro dell'Emilia
1945
GP Industria & Commercio di Prato
1948
Giro d'Italia:
Winner stage 10
9th place overall classification
1949
Giro d'Italia:
Winner stage 5
8th place overall classification
1951
Giro d'Italia:
Winner stage 11
Tour de France:
Winner stages 5 and 13
Wearing yellow jersey for one day
1953
Sassari
1955
Pisa
1956
Pisa

External links 

Italian male cyclists
Italian Tour de France stage winners
Italian Giro d'Italia stage winners
1920 births
1983 deaths
People from Pistoia
Sportspeople from the Province of Pistoia
Cyclists from Tuscany